Claude Volter (31 January 1933 – 15 October 2002), father of actor Philippe Volter, was a Belgian comedian and theatre director. 

Born as Claude Wolter in 1933, he later changed his surname  to Volter. In 1957, he and his wife, actress Jacqueline Bir, moved to Brussels, and founded the Comédie Claude Volter, which he led until his death in 2002 at the age of 69.

External links
 

1933 births
2002 deaths
Belgian male stage actors
Belgian theatre directors 
Entertainers from Brussels
French National Academy of Dramatic Arts alumni